Alsumaria News is an independent Iraqi satellite TV network that transmits on Nilesat 102, 

Hot Bird 8, and NOORSAT/Eurobird. Established by a group of businessmen in 2004, it has 700 employees across Iraq, Lebanon, the United Arab Emirates, and Jordan.

Alsumaria adopts a liberal perspective whilst maintaining religious faith and strongly refuting repression and autocracy. Alsumaria produces almost all of its 24/7 programs in-house. It broadcasts live entertainment, social, political, and game shows hosted by young Iraqis, and drama and comedy series starred, directed, and produced by Iraqis.

Alsumaria have exclusive rights to broadcast various movies, documentaries, musicals, children, entertainment, and sports shows.

Channels
Terrestrial broadcasting 64 UHF

NileSat 102
Frequency: 12130 MHz
Polarization: Vertical
Symbol rate: 27.5 Mb/s
FEC: 5/6

HotBird 8 13° East
Transponder: 77
Frequency: 12245 MHz
Polarization: Horizontal
Symbol Rate: 27.500 M Symbol
FEC: 3/4

Availability
It is made available for a primarily-Arab audience throughout the world via satellite, online streaming through its website and in the Americas on myTV.

References

 Alsumaria

External links

Television stations in Iraq
Arabic-language television stations
Television channels and stations established in 2004